Romero Rubio is an elevated station on Line B of the Mexico City Metro system.  The station serves the Colonia Moctezuma 2a Sección and Colonia Romero Rubio neighborhoods of Venustiano Carranza borough in Mexico City.

The logo for the station is a bust of Manuel Romero Rubio, who was Secretary of the Interior under President Porfirio Díaz and a founding member of the Científicos – a group of advisors to the President, as well as Díaz's father-in-law.

The station was opened on 15 December 1999.

From 23 April to 28 June 2020, the station was temporarily closed due to the COVID-19 pandemic in Mexico.

Ridership

See also
Encuentro Oceanía, a shopping mall found next to the station

References

External links 
 
 

Romero Rubio
Railway stations opened in 1999
1999 establishments in Mexico
Mexico City Metro stations in Venustiano Carranza, Mexico City
Accessible Mexico City Metro stations